The Whitney Section House, also known as Whitney Station, is a historic railroad-related building in Wasilla, Alaska. It is a single-story wood-frame structure, which was built in 1917 by the Alaska Railroad. The area where it stood was taken by the federal government for Elmendorf Air Force Base, and was rescued from demolition by the local chapter of the National Railroad Historical Society. It now stands on the grounds of the Alaska Museum of Transportation and Industry in Wasilla, and has seen a variety of uses.

The building was listed on the National Register of Historic Places in 2004.

See also
National Register of Historic Places listings in Matanuska-Susitna Borough, Alaska

References

1917 establishments in Alaska
Alaska Railroad
Houses in Anchorage, Alaska
Relocated buildings and structures in Alaska
Transport infrastructure completed in 1917
Wasilla, Alaska
Railway buildings and structures on the National Register of Historic Places
Houses in Matanuska-Susitna Borough, Alaska
Buildings and structures on the National Register of Historic Places in Matanuska-Susitna Borough, Alaska
Railway buildings and structures on the National Register of Historic Places in Alaska
Houses on the National Register of Historic Places in Alaska